Strawn may refer to:

Places
Strawn, Illinois
Strawn, Texas
Strawn Pass, mountain pass of Antarctica

Other uses
Strawn (surname)